Renick Farm may refer to:

Renick Farm (South Bloomfield, Ohio), listed on the National Register of Historic Places in Pickaway County, Ohio
Renick Farm (Renick, West Virginia), listed on the National Register of Historic Places in Greenbrier County, West Virginia